The 15th Military Police Brigade, stationed at Fort Leavenworth, Kansas, is an active duty United States Army corrections and detention brigade under the United States Army Corrections Command.

History 
Originally stationed in Germany, the 15th Military Police Brigade was the first military police brigade activated in the U.S. Army, only to be deactivated in 1976.  On 28 Sept 2010, the United States Army Correctional Brigade was reflagged as the 15th Military Police Brigade.

Subordinate units 
40th Military Police Battalion (Detention), which oversees operations of the U.S. Disciplinary Barracks.
705th Military Police Battalion (Detention), which oversees operations of the Joint Regional Correctional Facility.

References

External links 

 
 U.S. Army in Europe: 15th Military Police Brigade

015
Military units and formations established in 1965